The name Lettau, like its variants Lettow and Lettou, derives from a medieval Saxon name for Lithuania. It appears in the General Prologue to The Canterbury Tales, wherein it is said of the Knight, a veteran of the Baltic Crusades: "Ful ofte tyme he hadde the bord bigonne / Aboven alle nacions in Pruce; / In Lettow hadde he reysed, and in Ruce, / No Cristen man so ofte of his degree."

Lettau was the German name for the village of Litwa near Włodowo (Waltersdorf) in the Masurian Lakeland, formerly part of the Oberland (highlands) of East Prussia. It was located beside Lettau See ("Lake Lithuania"), now called Jezioro Litewskie ("Lithuanian Lake"), which lies on the border between Olsztyn and Ostróda, counties of northeastern Poland's Warmian-Masurian Voivodeship.

People with the surname include:
 Georg Lettau (1878–1951), German lichenologist
 Heinz Lettau (1909–2005), Professor of Meteorology at the University of Wisconsin
 Kevyn Lettau (born 1959), German-born jazz vocalist
 Reinhard Lettau (1929–1996), German-American writer and professor

See also
 German toponymy

References 

 Dictionary of American Family Names, Oxford University Press, 2013

External links 
 Website of Lettow-Vorbeck family (in German)
 Lithuania and Britain: an entwined history, by Dr. Francis Young, 2020